The  San Jose SaberCats season was the 14th season for the franchise. The SaberCats looked to improve on their 13–3 record from 2007 and defend their ArenaBowl title. Finishing the regular season with an 11–5 record, though not as successful as the previous season, still won them a third consecutive Western Division title, and they went into the playoffs as the 2nd seed in the American Conference. In their Divisional round game, they defeated the Colorado Crush, 64–51, to advance to the American Conference Championship. In that game, the SaberCats defeated the Grand Rapids Rampage 81–55, to advance to their second consecutive ArenaBowl. The SaberCats played the Philadelphia Soul in ArenaBowl XXII, which they lost, 59–56.

Standings

Regular season schedule

Playoff schedule

Staff

Final roster

Stats

Regular season

Week 1: at Chicago Rush

Week 2: at Grand Rapids Rampage

Week 3: vs. Arizona Rattlers

Week 4: vs. Dallas Desperados

Week 5: at Kansas City Brigade

Week 6: at New Orleans VooDoo

Week 7: vs. Philadelphia Soul

Week 8: at Utah Blaze

Week 9: vs. Los Angeles Avengers

Week 10: at Orlando Predators

Week 11: at Arizona Rattlers

Week 12: vs. Utah Blaze

Week 13: vs. Colorado Crush

Week 14: at Los Angeles Avengers

Week 15
Bye Week

Week 16: vs. Tampa Bay Storm

Week 17: vs. Georgia Force

Playoffs

American Conference Divisional: vs. (5) Colorado Crush

American Conference Championship: vs. (6) Grand Rapids Rampage

ArenaBowl XXII: vs. (1) Philadelphia Soul

References

External links

San Jose SaberCats
San Jose SaberCats seasons
San Jose SaberCats